John Major formed the second Major ministry following the 1992 general election after being invited by Queen Elizabeth II to begin a new administration. His government fell into minority status on 13 December 1996.

Formation
The change of leader from Margaret Thatcher to John Major saw a dramatic turnaround in Tory support, with the double-digit lead in the opinion polls for the Labour Party being replaced by a narrow Conservative one by the turn of 1991. Although a general election did not have to be held until June 1992, Labour leader Neil Kinnock kept pressurising Major to hold an election during 1991, but Major resisted the calls and there was no election that year.

The recession which began in the autumn of 1990 deepened during 1991, with unemployment standing at nearly 2.5 million by December 1991, compared to 1.6 million just 18 months earlier. Despite this, Tory support in the opinion polls remained relatively strong, with any Labour lead now being by the narrowest of margins, although Labour still made some gains at the expense of the Tories in local elections, and seized the Monmouth seat from the Tories in a by-election.

Major finally called an election for 9 April 1992 which ended the first Major ministry. In a surprise to most pollsters, Major won the election, which led to the formation of the Second Major Ministry and a fourth consecutive Conservative term in office.

There was widespread media and public debate as to whether the Labour Party could ever win a general election again, as they had failed to do so in 1992, despite the Conservative government having been in power for over a decade and presiding over a recession for the second time. At the same time, there was much private debate (made public many years later in the memoirs of senior figures including John Major himself) within the Conservative government as to whether a fifth successive general election victory was a realistic possibility.

The new term of parliament saw Major gain a new opponent in John Smith, who succeeded Neil Kinnock as Labour leader.

However, the months which followed the 1992 general election saw a series of events which went a long way towards deciding the outcome of the next general election long before it was even on the political horizon.

Fate

On Wednesday 16 September 1992, the pound sterling crashed out of the European Exchange Rate Mechanism after Chancellor of the Exchequer Norman Lamont had invested heavily in trying to keep it there, adjusting interest rates four times in one day as a desperate measure, an event which became known as Black Wednesday, leaving the Conservative government's reputation for economic excellence in tatters. Labour was soon ascendant in the opinion polls, and next few years brought a string of heavy defeats for the Conservatives in local council elections and parliamentary by-elections, with both Labour and the Liberal Democrats benefiting at their expense.

Internal Conservative Party feuding on Europe and the government defeat on the Maastricht Treaty further dented the government's popularity, as did coal mine closures announced in late 1992, and a series of scandals involving MPs.

The end of the recession was declared in April 1993 after nearly three years, and unemployment – which had peaked at nearly 3,000,000 people by the end of 1992 – quickly began to fall. It had fallen below 2,500,000 within two years of the recession's end, and by the end of 1996 it was below the 2,000,000 mark. Freed from the European Exchange Rate Mechanism, the British economy outperformed the rest of the continent for the first time in a generation.

However, the strong economic recovery failed to make much difference to the dismal Conservative performance in the opinion polls. Labour leader John Smith died of a sudden heart attack in May 1994 and was succeeded by Tony Blair, who continued the modernisation process of the party which began under Smith's predecessor Neil Kinnock, by branding the party as: "New Labour", and by the end of that year the opinion polls were showing Labour support as high as 60% – putting them more than 30 points ahead of the Conservatives.

With the Conservative government remaining divided on Europe and much more, John Major, in an attempt to silence his critics and opponents, announced his resignation as party leader – but not as Prime Minister – in June 1995, triggering a leadership election. He was opposed by John Redwood, the Secretary of State for Wales, and Major won the leadership election without much difficulty.

The Conservative majority of 21 seats was gradually eroded by a string of by-election defeats as well as the defection of one MP to Labour, and by the turn of 1997 the Conservatives were without a majority in the House of Commons.

Major left it until the last possible moment before calling a general election, finally holding it on Thursday, 1 May 1997. He pinned his hopes of election success on a six-week campaign exposing New Labour's policies to scrutiny, as well as pointing towards a booming economy and falling unemployment. However, as the Conservatives had denied responsibility for the recession at the turn of the decade, few voters were willing to give them credit for the economic recovery, and Labour returned to power after eighteen years in opposition, with a 179-seat majority that saw several powerful Conservative figures (most notably Michael Portillo, widely tipped to be the next Leader of the Conservative Party) lose their seats and the loss of all Conservative seats in Wales and Scotland; the Conservatives subsequently suffered their worst general election result of the twentieth century and their place in government was taken by Labour, led by Tony Blair, after four successive parliamentary terms of Conservative Party rule.

The Conservatives did not return to government until 2010, and did not win a parliamentary majority until 2015, having had to form a coalition with the Liberal Democrats in order to form their first government under David Cameron.

Cabinet

April 1992 to May 1993

Changes
On 24 September 1992 David Mellor resigns as Secretary of State for National Heritage following tabloid reporting of an affair with actress Antonia de Sancha. He was replaced by Peter Brooke.

May 1993 to July 1994

July 1994 to July 1995

July 1995 to May 1997

List of ministers
Members of the Cabinet are in bold face.

References

Further reading

External links

British ministries
Government
1990s in the United Kingdom
1992 establishments in the United Kingdom
1997 disestablishments in the United Kingdom
Ministry 2
Ministries of Elizabeth II
Cabinets established in 1992
Cabinets disestablished in 1997